Mount Strong is a ridge-like mountain about 5 nautical miles (9 km) east of the Eland Mountains, in Palmer Land. Mapped by United States Geological Survey (USGS) in 1974. Named by Advisory Committee on Antarctic Names (US-ACAN) for Frank E. Strong, United States Antarctic Research Program (USARP) biologist at Palmer Station in 1971–72.

Mountains of Palmer Land